Hughley is a civil parish in Shropshire, England.  It contains four listed buildings that are recorded in the National Heritage List for England.  Of these, one is listed at Grade I, the highest of the three grades, one is at Grade II*, the middle grade, and the others are at Grade II, the lowest grade. The parish contains the village of Hughley and the surrounding countryside.  The listed buildings are all in the village, and consist of a church, a former smithy, and two houses.


Key

Buildings

References

Citations

Sources

Lists of buildings and structures in Shropshire